Deep water blackout may refer to:
 Ascent blackout in which loss of consciousness occurs on ascent following a deep breath-hold dive 
 Loss of consciousness associated with extreme nitrogen narcosis on deep air dives.